The Best of Restless Heart is the first compilation album by the American country music group of the same name. It was released by RCA Nashville in 1991. "You Can Depend on Me" and "Familiar Pain" were released as singles. The album reached #25 on the Top Country Albums chart.

Track listing

Personnel on tracks 1 and 6 

Restless Heart
 John Dittrich – drums, acoustic piano
 Paul Gregg – bass guitar, vocals
 David Innis – keyboards, vocals
 Greg Jennings – guitars, mandolin, vocals
 Larry Stewart – lead vocals

Additional Musicians
 Rusty Young – steel guitar

Production
 Josh Leo – producer (1, 6)
 Larry Lee – producer (1, 6)
 Restless Heart – producers (2-5, 7-10)
 Tim DuBois – producer (2-5, 7-10)
 Scott Hendricks – producer (2-5, 7-10)
 Mike Clute – engineer (1, 6)
 Steve Marcantonio – engineer (1, 6)
 Gary Hellman – remixing (8)
 John Luongo – remixing (8)

Chart performance

References 

1991 greatest hits albums
Restless Heart albums
Albums produced by Scott Hendricks
RCA Records compilation albums